Manuel Estanislao Negrete Hernández (1946 – October 10, 1973), was a Chilean man who was allegedly killed by policemen serving Chilean dictator Augusto Pinochet.

Negrete was a farm worker who worked on plantation fields and had experience with plants, fruits and vegetables. He married a local girl in his town, the city of Curico.

In a case that would later on make headline news in Chile, Negrete was killed and two others were injured during a shooting on September 19 of that year. The exact cause of the shooting is not known, however, witnesses of the event claimed that an argument about something ended up causing a fight, which, in turn, led to the shooting.

What was said during the argument and the fight has never been known either, but it is possible that the conversation might have involved comments about Pinochet.

The argument, fight and subsequent shooting took place in a bar at Sagrada Familia. Negrete had been drinking alcohol that night as he celebrated with his friends, and alcohol may have played a part in the events that happened later that night.

According to records that were discovered after Pinochet left Chile's presidency, three gunmen entered the bar after the argument had spilled into a fist fight and started firing shots, injuring Negrete. Negrete ran to the back of the bar, finding a door that led him outside the store. Thinking that he could get away from the chaos without further injury, Negrete was surprised to find policemen there. They began to shoot him, hitting him several times, specifically in the brain and thorax.

Negrete was taken by friends to a Curico hospital after the shooting. He remained hospitalized there in intensive care for 21 days before dying. Medical records, also disclosed publicly after Pinochet left the presidency, showed that Negrete may have survived had it not been for one specific bullet wound between his thorax and his brain. That specific wound caused his blood to become poisoned, and he died of sepsis caused by the blood poisoning.

During the 1990s, Negrete Hernandez was declared an "International human rights victim" by the International Project for Human Rights, based in London.

External links
Memoria Viva's page on Negrete, in Spanish

References

1946 births
1973 deaths
Deaths from sepsis
People from Curicó
Deaths by firearm in Chile
Infectious disease deaths in Chile